Faravan (also Romanized as Faravān, Farvān, Farwān, and Forvān) is a village in Faravan Rural District, Kohanabad District, Aradan County, Semnan Province, Iran. At the 2006 census, its population was 894, in 261 families.

References 

Populated places in Aradan County